Queening may refer to:
 In chess, the promotion of a pawn to a queen
 The sexual practice of facesitting